Madan-e Khak-e Nasuz-e Godar Dashtuk (also Romanized as Ma‘dan-e Khāk-e Nasūz-e Godār Dashtūk) is a village in Montazeriyeh Rural District, in the Central District of Tabas County, South Khorasan Province, Iran. At the 2006 census, its population was 12, in 4 families.

References 

Populated places in Tabas County